Dawson's Weekly is a British television series featuring seven half-hour comedy plays, written by Ray Galton and Alan Simpson, and starring Les Dawson. It ran from 12 June to 29 July 1975.

References

External links
 
 

1975 British television series debuts
1975 British television series endings
1970s British comedy television series
ITV comedy
English-language television shows
Television series by Yorkshire Television